Gymnancyla sfakesella is a species of snout moth in the genus Gymnancyla. It was described by Pierre Chrétien in 1911 and is known from Spain, Algeria, Morocco, and Egypt.

The wingspan is 13.5-16.5 mm.

References

Moths described in 1911
Phycitini
Moths of Europe
Moths of Africa